The 1977 season was the eighth season of national competitive association football in Australia and 94th overall.

National teams

Australia men's national soccer team

Results and fixtures

Friendlies

1978 FIFA World Cup qualification

Group 5

Final round

Domestic soccer

National Soccer League

Cup competitions

NSL Cup

Final

References

External links
 Football Australia official website

1977 in Australian soccer
Seasons in Australian soccer